"Can We" is a song by American R&B trio SWV featuring guest vocals from Missy Elliott and production by Timbaland and Elliott. The song was eventually included on SWV's third album, Release Some Tension (1997), but was originally a hit earlier in the year when it was included on the soundtrack to the 1997 film, Booty Call.

"Can We" received major airplay on urban radio stations in the United States, but it was not commercially available for the public to purchase as a cassette or CD single in the US. At the time of its release, Billboard prevented album cuts from entering any singles charts; however, because of its attachment to the Booty Call soundtrack, "Can We" was able to chart on Billboard Hot 100, making it to number 75. Outside the US, the song topped the New Zealand Singles Chart and peaked at number 18 on the UK Singles Chart.

Music video
A music video for the single was directed by Jesse Vaughan and premiered on music video stations in February 1997. The synopsis of the video primarily focuses on SWV, dressed in cheetah-print attire, dancing in front of matching backgrounds with their love interests. Missy Elliott is also featured in the video, where she is seen dancing in a newspaper-covered background.

Track listings
UK and European maxi-CD
 Can We (LP version) — 4:51
 Can We (instrumental) — 4:49
 Can We (a cappella) — 4:49
 Can We (radio edit No. 1) — 4:15
 Can We (radio edit No. 2) — 4:15
 Can We (no rap radio) — 3:56

US 12-inch vinyl and maxi-CD
 "Can We" (radio edit No. 1) — 4:19
 "Can We" (radio edit No. 2) — 4:19
 "Can We" (no rap radio) — 3:56
 "Can We" (LP version) — 4:51
 "Can We" (instrumental) — 4:49
 "Can We" (a cappella) — 4:49

Charts and certifications

Weekly charts

Year-end charts

Certifications

References

1997 singles
1997 songs
Missy Elliott songs
Number-one singles in New Zealand
Song recordings produced by Timbaland
Songs written by Missy Elliott
Songs written by Timbaland
SWV songs